Donald Lee Parsons (born July 21, 1947) is a member of the House of Representatives in Georgia. Parsons is a Republican representing District 44 which encompasses parts of Cobb County.

References

External links 
 Don Parsons Bio

Republican Party members of the Georgia House of Representatives
Living people
21st-century American politicians
1947 births